A con artist is a person who performs a confidence trick.

Con artist may also refer to:

 The Con Artists (1976 film), an Italian crime-comedy film
 The Con Artist, a 2010 US romantic comedy film
 The Con Artists (2014 film), a South Korean heist film

See also
 Confidence man (disambiguation)